Amlala is a village located in the Mohali District in the state of Punjab, India. It is the only village in the area to have a post office.

Location
To the west flows the River Ghhgar; to the north is Chandiala, and to the south is Baruali. To the east is a military area, which provides employment for many of the villagers.

Religious structure
Although the population of the village is mostly Sikhs, the head of the village is currently ( a Muslim. There are two temples in the village along with a mosque and two gurudwaras.

Economy
The main occupation of the villagers is agriculture, which is quite profitable, due to the nearby river.

References 
 https://web.archive.org/web/20080725085551/http://www.mypind.com/pat/patPage39.htm

External links 

Mohali